"My Vision" is a song by English DJ and producer Dave Lee, released on 30 September 2002 under one of his stage names, Jakatta. The track features British musician Seal on vocals. Lee wrote the song along with Seal and Rick Salmon, and it was produced by Lee. "My Vision" experienced commercial success, peaking at number six on the UK Singles Chart and entering the top 50 on the music charts of five other countries. A music video made for the song features Seal singing in a desert.

Critical reception
Mario Mosic of Croatian radio station Radio Dalmacija said of "My Vision", "It's a cool track ... Whenever Seal , his voice lends something special to the track, no matter what the background music is".

Chart performance
On 6 October 2002, "My Vision" debuted and peaked at number six on the UK Singles Chart, remaining in the top 100 for 11 nonconsecutive weeks. Elsewhere in Europe, the single reached number 16 in Spain, number 24 in Italy, number 34 in Ireland, and number 36 in the Flanders region of Belgium. On the Eurochart Hot 100, it debuted at number 26, its peak. In Australia, it spent one week in the top 50 at number 43, and it also reached number 10 on the ARIA Dance Chart.

Track listings

UK CD single
 "My Vision" (radio edit) – 3:43
 "My Vision" (Summer in White edit) – 3:52
 "My Vision" (Joey Negro club mix) – 7:47

UK 12-inch single
A. "My Vision" (Joey Negro club edit) – 7:47
B. "My Vision" (Layo and Bushwacka! remix) – 8:01

Australian CD single
 "My Vision" (radio edit) – 3:45
 "My Vision" (Joey Negro club edit) – 7:47
 "My Vision" (Layo and Bushwacka! remix) – 8:01

Credits and personnel
Credits are taken from the UK CD single liner notes.

Recording location
 Vocals recorded in Beverly Hills, California, US

Personnel

 Dave Lee (Jakatta) – writing, production, mixing
 Seal – writing, vocals
 Rick Salmon – writing
 Michele Chiavarini – keys

 Richard Chycki – recording
 John O'Donnell – engineering
 Form – design
 Stylorouge – logo

Charts

Weekly charts

Year-end charts

Release history

References

2002 songs
2002 singles
Dave Lee (DJ) songs
Ministry of Sound singles
Seal (musician) songs
Songs written by Seal (musician)